was a Japanese samurai of the late Edo period, who served the Shimazu clan of Satsuma, and went on to become a government official of the early Meiji period. Komatsu ruled the fief of Yoshitoshi, which was a part of the Satsuma Domain. Appointed karō in 1862, he held high office in the Satsuma domain until its dissolution in 1871. Komatsu was also a descendant of the Sengoku-era samurai Nejime Shigenaga.

Early life and adoption
Komatsu Tatewaki was born the third son of Kimotsuki Kaneyoshi of Kiire (5500 koku) who were high-ranking Satsuma retainers. His birth name was Kimotsuki Kaneshige  He was adopted by Komatsu Kiyomichi as a young man and married  Komatsu Ochika, and inherited the headship in 1856, immediately after his adoption and became Komatsu Kiyokado (Tatewaki)

Satsuma career
Komatsu became a karō in the service of Shimazu Tadayoshi, the daimyō of Satsuma, in 1862. He was the official advocate of low-ranking men such as Ōkubo Toshimichi. He also helped shelter Sakamoto Ryōma.

Meiji era
In the first few years of the Meiji era, Komatsu served as an official in the Imperial government.

Later life and death

While in Kagoshima, Komatsu fell ill and died in 1870.

Before he died he wrote a letter to Okoto, his concubine in Kyoto, directing her to give their son Komatsu Kiyonao to his wife Ochika to be raised as the head of the Komatsu family. He was buried in the Komatsu family shrine beside both Ochika and Okoto. The Komatsu family shrine is located in the city of Hiyoki, known in modern-day as the Kagoshima Prefecture.

Notes

References
This article was derived in part from corresponding content on the Japanese Wikipedia.
Beasley, William G. (1972). The Meiji Restoration. Stanford: Stanford University Press.
Black, John R. (1881). Young Japan: Yokohama and Yedo. London: Trubner & co.
Morris, J (1907). Makers of Japan. London: Methuen & Co.
 "Nejime-shi" on Harimaya.com (15 August 2008)

Shimazu retainers
Samurai
Karō
People of the Boshin War
People from Satsuma Domain
Meiji Restoration
Japanese politicians
1835 births
1870 deaths